This is a list of butterflies of Seychelles. About 25 species are known from Seychelles, three of which are endemic.

Papilionidae

Papilioninae

Papilionini
Papilio phorbanta nana Oberthür, 1879

Pieridae

Coliadinae
Eurema brigitta pulchella (Boisduval, 1833)
Eurema floricola aldabrensis Bernardi, 1969
Catopsilia florella (Fabricius, 1775)

Pierinae
Colotis evanthides (Holland, 1896)

Pierini
Belenois aldabrensis (Holland, 1896) (endemic)
Belenois grandidieri (Mabille, 1878)

Lycaenidae

Theclinae

Theclini
Hypolycaena philippus ramonza (Saalmüller, 1878)

Polyommatinae

Polyommatini
Leptotes pirithous (Linnaeus, 1767)
Zizeeria knysna (Trimen, 1862)
Zizula hylax (Fabricius, 1775)

Nymphalidae

Danainae

Danaini
Danaus chrysippus orientis (Aurivillius, 1909)
Amauris niavius dominicanus Trimen, 1879
Euploea mitra Moore, 1858 (endemic)

Satyrinae

Melanitini
Melanitis leda (Linnaeus, 1758)

Nymphalinae

Nymphalini
Junonia hierta cebrene Trimen, 1870
Junonia oenone epiclelia (Boisduval, 1833)
Junonia orithya madagascariensis Guenée, 1865
Junonia rhadama (Boisduval, 1833)
Hypolimnas misippus (Linnaeus, 1764)

Heliconiinae

Acraeini
Acraea neobule legrandi Carcasson, 1964

Vagrantini
Phalanta phalantha aethiopica (Rothschild & Jordan, 1903)
Phalanta philiberti (de Joannis, 1893) (endemic)

Hesperiidae

Pyrginae

Tagiadini
Eagris sabadius aldabranus Fryer, 1912
Eagris sabadius maheta Evans, 1937

Hesperiinae

Baorini
Borbo borbonica morella (de Joannis, 1893)
Borbo gemella (Mabille, 1884)

See also
List of moths of Seychelles
Wildlife of Seychelles

References

Butterflies
Seychelles
Seychelles